Raymond Stephen Henry Revell (9 March 1911 – 18 November 1968) is recognized as one of Australia’s most respected speedcar (midget) drivers. He was an inaugural inductee into the Australian Speedway Hall of Fame in 2007, and the Australian Motor Sport Hall of Fame in 2016.

Between 1936 and 1964, Revell amassed over 116 career feature race victories, including 5 World Championships/ Derby events (1942, 1948, 1950, 1952, 1956)  and 7 Australian Championships (1946, 1949, 1950, 1951, 1952, 1953, 1957).

Ray Revell raced in New South Wales, Queensland, Victoria, South Australia, Western Australia and the United States of America. Revell won his first race in America driving for film star Lana TurnerRay Revell modified his oval track speedcar to run on road courses, most notably Mt Panorama, Bathurst and Strath Pine Airstrip in Queensland.  Revell's 'Rocket Car', with rockets attached to the rear of his A Model Speedcar Q18, was renowned for drawing crowds to speedway.

Revell was known for being the first Australian to race an Offenhauser in Australia. Revell purchased the car from millionaire businessman and philanthropist Howard Keck and shipped the car to Australia for the 1949-50 season.

In the post War years, Revell was often matched against international drivers in a series of short races. These races featured Americans Perry Grimm and Cal Niday, Englishman Bill Reynolds, New Zealander Reece Discombe and American/New Zealander Frank "Satan" Brewer. 

Revell regularly captained the Australian Speedcar Team in races against the USA and New Zealand. Revell also conducted "Match Races" in his midget against speedway motor bike star Andy Menzies.

Revell was best known for his Speedcar racing, but he also participated in promoting Stock Cars racing and was the winner of the first Stock Car race in Australia

Speedcar Historian Bill Lawler wrote that Revell was "the undisputed winningest driver at both the Sydney Showground (54 wins) and the Sydney Sports Ground (28 wins). Revell also mastered the tight ¼ mile Brisbane Exhibition Ground Speedway and is in 5th place in all-time winners there."

A street in the suburb of Gordon in the Australian Capital Territory bears his name.

New South Wales & Queensland Speedcar/Midget Feature Race Victories

Legacy 
Ray's son Howard was a successful Speedcar driver who became known as the Marathon Man because of his success in 100 lap races.
 
Grandson Craig also competed in Speedcars without achieving any feature race wins, but has had victory as a car owner.
 
Grandson Glenn won the 1994 NSW Speedcar Championship (44 years after Ray won the same title for the 3rd time in 1950), .

References

External links 
Andrew Moore, 'Revell, Raymond Stephen Henry (1911–1968)', Australian Dictionary of Biography, National Centre of Biography, Australian National University, http://adb.anu.edu.au/biography/revell-raymond-stephen-henry-11510/text20533, published first in hardcopy 2002, accessed online 21 March 2016.
Australian Newspaper Records on Ray Revell 
Ray Revell Australia http://justmidgets.homestead.com/Rayrevell.html
Ray Revell - A model -Q1 http://justmidgets.homestead.com/RevellQ1.html
Ray Revell - Offenhauser Aust. # 1 http://justmidgets.homestead.com/Revell-Offy.html
Ray Revell Memorial http://www.speedway.net.au/archive_release.asp?NewsId=32826#.VvksEvl97IU
AUSTRALIAN SPEEDWAY HALL OF FAME INDUCTEES SUNDAY JUNE 17, 2007. N A S R NATIONAL OFFICE http://www.speedway.net.au/archive_release.asp?NewsId=23649#.Vu6Jm_l97IU
Bill Lawler’s Magnificent 25 Australian Speedcar/midget Drivers Of All Time http://www.midgetmadness.com/forums/index.php?showtopic=11984
 J. Medley, Bathurst: Cradle of Australian Motor Racing (Syd, 1997)
 Sports Car World, Oct 1959, p 30
 The Remarkable Racing Revells!! Racing Car News, February 1980, p54-57
 Australian Speedway News, no 59, 1974, p 18
 Australian Speedcar Championship Facebook https://www.facebook.com/AustralianSpeedcarChampionship/info/?tab=page_info
 Australian Speedcar Championship Australian Speedcar Championship
 Australian Speedway Hall of Fame http://www.speedwayaustralia.net.au/information/hall-of-fame/
 Australian Motor Sport Hall of Fame http://speedcafe.com.au/halloffame
 Queensland Speedcar Championship http://www.talkingspeedway.com/general/who-will-be-the-queensland-speedcar-champion-for-2013/

Australian racing drivers
1911 births
1968 deaths